This page covers all relevant details regarding PFC Cherno More Varna for all official competitions inside the 1974–75 season. These are A Group and Bulgarian Cup.

Squad and league statistics

Matches

A Group

League table

Results summary

League performance

References

PFC Cherno More Varna seasons
Cherno More Varna